Esther Griffith is a Trinidadian painter. She mainly paints portraits.

Griffith is a graduate of the University of the West Indies. She works in oil and watercolor. Apart from painting, she also creates ceramics.

Trinidad and Tobago Guardian described one of her paintings as "radiated with an air of optimism but also reinforced a sense of shifts and motion with its energetic brushstrokes." Trinidad and Tobago Newsday states that "her paintings are usually portraits where hyper-realism is juxtaposed against the abstract."

She has made portraits for Wiki Unseen, a Wikimedia Foundation collaboration aimed at providing depictions for BIPOC Wikipedia biographies without an image of the subject. As of 2022, she lives in Trinidad and Tobago.

References

External links
 
 Amplifying Black & Diverse Histories with Wikimedia, 2022 interview at CVM Television
 2022 interview at AZP News
 Category:Wiki Unseen at Wikimedia Commons, including some of Griffith's works

Living people
20th-century Trinidad and Tobago women
21st-century Trinidad and Tobago women
Trinidad and Tobago women painters
Year of birth missing (living people)
Trinidad and Tobago watercolourists